Zsolt Kalmár (born 9 June 1995) is a Hungarian professional footballer who plays as a midfielder for Fortuna Liga club DAC Dunajská Streda and the Hungary national team.

Kalmár began his professional career with Nemzeti Bajnokság I club ETO Győr in 2013, winning the league title in his first year, before moving to 2. Bundesliga club RB Leipzig a year later. He then moved on loans to FSV Frankfurt, Brøndby and DAC Dunajská Streda, agreeing to join the latter on a permanent deal in 2018, growing out to become team captain in his second season at the club.

Kalmár made his senior international debut for Hungary in 2014. He has earned over 20 caps.

Club career

Győr

Youth
Kalmár joined the Győri ETO youth academy in 2005, where he progressed through the various youth teams. For the 2012–13 season, he was given the opportunity to play for the club's reserves at the age of 17. In October 2012, he was on a trial with Dutch league leaders Feyenoord.

Kalmár made his debut in a match which was lost 1–0 to Zalaegerszeg, in which he entered the pitch as a starter and remained there throughout. On 20 April 2013, he scored his first goal for the reserves against Csákvár in a 3–3 draw. During the season, he made seven appearances for the reserves in which he scored one goal.

First team
Attila Pintér, the then manager of the first team, used Kalmár twice as a substitute during the 2012–13 season. On 19 May 2013, he made his debut against Budapest Honvéd in the first-tier Nemzeti Bajnokság I. He made his second league appearance against Egri FC and scored his first goal in the away match which was won 2–3. Győr won the league title at the end of the season.

In the 2013–14 season, he became a regular part of the first-team squad. He scored a goal in the season opener in the Szuperkupa against Debreceni VSC in a match won 3–0 at the Ferenc Puskás Stadium. After the championship title of the previous season, 2013–14 ended in second place behind Debreceni VSC.

RB Leipzig
Kalmár signed a five-year contract with 2. Bundesliga side RB Leipzig on 28 July 2014. He made his debut on 22 August, coming on as a substitute for Joshua Kimmich during a 1–0 home win against Erzgebirge Aue. He made his first start on 30 November against SV Sandhausen before being replaced by Stefan Hierländer in the 80th minute. On 12 December, Leipzig took a 2–1 home win over SpVgg Greuther Fürth at home. Fellow Hungarian Zsolt Korcsmár played for the guests, as Kalmár appeared for 25 minutes during the match and received a yellow card. During the winter training camp in Qatar, Kalmár scored the winning goal in a 2–1 pre-season friendly against Qatar SC. On 15 February 2015, Leizpig lost 1–0 to FSV Frankfurt with Kalmár playing the entire match. During the season, Kalmár made 17 league appearances.

On 23 August, he made his first appearance of the season in the 4th matchday of the season as a substitute, as Leipzig lost 1–0 to FC St. Pauli. In the next match, he came on as a substitute in the 69th minute against Union Berlin. Two minutes later, his free kick was saved by opposing goalkeeper Daniel Haas, but managed to be decisive as Michael Parensen scored an own goal off Kalmár's pass. On 10 January 2016, during the winter break, he entered the pitch in the second half of the pre-season friendly against German sixth tier club FC Eilenburg and scored a hat-trick as Leipzig won the match 13–0. He finished the season with four league appearances, and due to a lack of playing opportunities, Leipzig wanted to send him on loan. Fortuna Düsseldorf, FSV Frankfurt, Ferencváros and Sturm Graz were suitors in signing him on a loan deal.

Loan to FSV Frankfurt
He was loaned to 2. Bundesliga club FSV Frankfurt on 28 January 2016. In his new club, he was given jersey number 13. He debuted in a match against Karlsruher SC on 7 February, coming on as a substitute in the 69th minute. He scored his first goal for the club on 2 March in a match against MSV Duisburg. He finished his stint in Frankfurt with 12 league appearances, in which he scored the sole goal and contributed with one assist, before returning to Leipzig after his loan deal expired.

Loan to Brøndby IF
On 30 January 2017, Kalmár joined Brøndby IF on a long-loan deal until June 2018. At Brøndby, he played under head coach Alexander Zorniger and assistant coach Tamás Bódog, whom he already knew from his time at Leipzig. Kalmar inherited the number 11 jersey from Brøndby legend Johan Elmander, who had left the club in the summer of 2016. In the pre-season friendly against South Korean club Jeonbuk Hyundai Motors he made his first appearance in the starting line-up, as they won 3–1. On 19 February, he made his league debut against Copenhagen, coming on as a 75th-minute substitute for Frederik Holst. The next day, in a match between the Brøndby and Lyngby reserves, Kalmár scored from a strike from distance in his team's 3–1 win. On 8 March, Brøndby defeated third-tier BK Marienlyst 1–4 away in the Danish Cup round of 16. The fourth goal of the guests was scored by Kalmár, who made his first goal for the first team. Four days later in the league against AC Horsens, Kalmár made as assist when he in the 16th minute curled the ball from a free kick which Rodolph Austin headed home. On 9 April, in the second matchday of the Superliga championship play-offs, Brøndby beat Lyngby 2–1 at home. Kalmár spent 61 minutes on the pitch as a starter, and contributed with an assist on a goal by Teemu Pukki. Four days later, he came on as a substitute in the 79th minute of the Danish Cup quarter-finals against Randers, where he scored towards the end of extra time.

DAC Dunajská Streda
On 10 August 2017, as the loan with Brøndby had expired, Kalmár signed a one-season loan deal with Slovak club DAC Dunajská Streda. He made his debut for the club three days later in Fortuna Liga, on 13 August, in a match against Slovan Bratislava, replacing fellow countryman Kristopher Vida in the 55th minute. A week later, he contributed with a goal and an assist to defeat defending champions MŠK Žilina 4–2. In the eighth matchday of the season, he scored two goals against ViOn Zlaté Moravce as DAC won 3–2. At the end of the month, DAC fans voted Kalmár the best player of the fall.

On 6 July 2018, DAC Dunajská Streda triggered the option to buy Kalmár from RB Leipzig, signing him on a three-year contract. In the second matchday of the 2018–19 season, he scored a goal and made an assist as DAC won 4–1 over MFK Zemplín Michalovce. In the seventh matchday, DAC secured a 5–0 win over ŠKF Sereď after a goal and two assists by Kalmár. On 29 September, he scored on a penalty in a 2–1 win over Senica. On 2 October, in the fifth round of the Slovak Cup, he scored two goals and made an assist as DAC won 5–2 over third-tier club MFK Vranov nad Topľou. On 20 October, he scored again in a 3–2 win over Železiarne Podbrezová. At the end of the fall season, he scored four goals in 16 appearances and made five assists. At the end of the season, he had scored eight goals in 29 league appearances together with five assists, as DAC finished as runners-up in Slovak Super Liga. Slovak daily magazine Sport voted him in the "Dream Team" of the season.

Prior to the start of the following season, Kalmár was selected as the DAC team captain. In the first matchday of the new league season, he scored two goals against ViOn Zlaté Moravce, with his team winning 2–1. He also scored in the following match, with the DAC outperforming recently promoted FK Pohronie with a 5–1 final score. He then suffered a knee injury in early August, which required surgery and sidelined him for a longer period. He returned to the pitch on 20 October. In the following match, he scored a goal as DAC won 2–0 over Pohronie. As was the case in the previous season, Kalmár was in the league's dream team that season.

In the first round of the 2020–21 season, DAC defeated ŠKF Sereď 6–0, as Kalmár scored a goal and made an assist. In the next match, DAC also defeated FC Nitra 6–0, as Kalmár scored again. In the fifth matchday, Kalmár was again successful in front of goal as ViOn Zlaté Moravce drawn against, 2–2. In the following match, he scored two goals in a 3–2 win against MFK Ružomberok.

International career
Kalmár was part of the Hungary national under-19 team at the 2014 UEFA European Under-19 Championship and the under-20 team at the 2015 FIFA U-20 World Cup.

Kalmár has 23 caps for the senior team. He debuted against Denmark on 22 May 2014 coming on as a half-time substitute. His first appearance in the starting eleven came in a friendly to Russia.

After a long pause, he returned to the national team and played against Greece on 20 November 2022. He scored the second goal and thus the winning goal in a 2–1 victory at the Puskás Aréna.

Career statistics

Club

International

Scores and results list Hungary's goal tally first, score column indicates score after each Kalmár goal.

Honours
Győr
 Nemzeti Bajnokság I: 2012–13

References

External links
MLSZ 
HLSZ 

1995 births
Living people
Sportspeople from Győr
Hungarian footballers
Hungary international footballers
Hungary youth international footballers
Hungarian expatriate footballers
Association football midfielders
Győri ETO FC players
RB Leipzig players
FSV Frankfurt players
Brøndby IF players
FC DAC 1904 Dunajská Streda players
Nemzeti Bajnokság I players
Slovak Super Liga players
2. Bundesliga players
Danish Superliga players
Expatriate footballers in Germany
Expatriate men's footballers in Denmark
Expatriate footballers in Slovakia
Hungarian expatriate sportspeople in Germany
Hungarian expatriate sportspeople in Denmark
Hungarian expatriate sportspeople in Slovakia